FASOR is an acronym for frequency addition source of optical radiation. The name is used for a certain type of guide star laser deployed at US Air Force Research Laboratory facilities SOR and AMOS. The laser light is produced in a sum-frequency generation process from two solid-state laser sources that operate at different wavelengths. The frequencies of the sources add directly to a summed frequency.

Application
The FASOR was initially used for many laser guide star experiments. These have ranged from mapping the photon return verse wavelength, power, and pointing location in the sky. Two FASORS were used to show the advantages of 'back pumping' or pumping at both D2a and D2b lines.  Later a FASOR was used to measure the earth's magnetic field. It has also been used for its intended application of generating a laser guidestar for adaptive optics, see first reference.  It is tuned to the D2a hyperfine component of the sodium D line and used to excite sodium atoms in the mesospheric upper atmosphere. The FASOR consists of two single-frequency injection-locked Nd:YAG lasers close to 1064 and 1319 nm that are both resonant in a cavity containing a lithium triborate (LBO) crystal, which sums the frequencies yielding 589.159 nm light.

References

Laser science